Gene Cotton (born June 30, 1944 in Columbus, Ohio) is an American pop and folk singer-songwriter. He is best known for his four Billboard top 40 entries during the years 1976–1978. In the UK, he is most famous for the song "Me and the Elephant," which failed to make the top 40 best sellers, but was an airplay hit.

History
Cotton has been a resident of Leiper's Fork, Tennessee since the late 1970s. Between the late 1990s and mid 2000s, Cotton scaled back his career as a singer and songwriter and spent much of his savings on a legal battle against the construction of Interstate 840 which surrounds Nashville, which substantially delayed the completion of the route and led to a partial redesign of one section. Cotton, the father of two adopted children and one biological child, has devoted himself to helping the underprivileged of his area by motivating them in their studies and activities through a program called Kids on Stage (KOS). KOS brings in Nashville artists to run summer classes that open the doors to the arts to kids who might otherwise never see greatness or think about greatness in their arts. Most notably, Grammy Award winner Michael McDonald has performed numerous times to bring awareness and raise donations for this program under Cotton's leadership, besides producing independent films about the plight of the poor around the world.

Cotton was instrumental in 1970s pop singer Michael Johnson's career.

In 2001, Cotton lost a race for a seat in District 63 of the Tennessee House of Representatives, to Republican Glen Casada. Casada won 3,185 votes to Cotton's 1,554 in a special election in which only 13 percent of registered voters cast ballots. Both Casada and Cotton campaigned on strong opposition to proposals for a state income tax.

Discography

Albums

Singles

Commercial Singles

Promotional Singles

References

External links
 
 Discogs

1944 births
Living people
American male singer-songwriters
Ariola Records artists
Myrrh Records artists
Singer-songwriters from Tennessee
Singer-songwriters from Ohio